Pitts Sanborn (1879–1941), was born John Pitts Sanborn in Port Huron, Michigan. He dropped the "John" for most of his professional career. After graduating Harvard in 1900, he established himself as a music critic, writing for the New York Globe, New York Mail and finally New York World-Telegram. As a poet he was published in Trend, for which he served as an editorial staffer beginning in 1914. As a novelist, his 1929 novel Prima Donna was called by one New York Times critic “an amazing achievement; nothing quite like it has been done in this country before.” He went on to put Sanborn in the same league with Willa Cather, Edith Wharton and Thornton Wilder. Sanborn was remarked upon as one of the great originals of 1920s-1930s culture. Sanborn's wealth of connections in intellectual and cultural circles included Van Wyck Brooks, Rosa Ponselle, Mark Van Doren and Llewelyn Jones. His friendship with Wallace Stevens (whom he met at Harvard) included a great influence upon Stevens’ interest in music and thus his poetry. He was a good friend and sometimes lover of Carl Van Vechten, who he convinced to assume editorship of Trend. He was also a radio commentator for the Philadelphia Orchestra. Sanborn died at 61 of an apparent heart attack in his Greenwich Village apartment a few hours after he had attended a performance at the Metropolitan Opera House. He had just completed the first paragraph of his review.

Bibliography
 “Mortality,” the Harvard Advocate
 Vie De Bordeaux. 1916. Nicholas L. Brown, Philadelphia. (Author's first book);
 “Anatole France-The Host.” Nov. 5, 1924. The Nation, page 489;
 “A Note on Gluck” Dec. 10, 1924. The Nation, page 661;
 “Puccini and Faure.” Dec. 24, 1924. The Nation, page 714;
 Prima Donna. 1929. The Book League of America. 2 vols.; 
 Greek Night. 1933. Lincoln Mac Veagh/Dial Press, New York;
 Metropolitan Book of Opera. 1937;
 Beethoven and His Nine Symphonies. 1939. Philharmonic-Symphony Society of New York;
 Brahms and Some of His Works. 1940. Philharmonic-Symphony Society of New York

References

External links
 
 

American music critics
1879 births
1941 deaths
Harvard University alumni
American male journalists
American male novelists
20th-century American journalists
20th-century American novelists
20th-century American non-fiction writers
20th-century American male writers
American male non-fiction writers
People from Port Huron, Michigan
Journalists from Michigan
Novelists from Michigan
American male poets
20th-century American poets
Poets from Michigan